The People's Palace of Culture (Korean: 인민문화궁전; Hanja: 人民文化宮殿) is a palace and theater located in Pyongyang, North Korea. Construction for the building finished in January 1974 and was opened to the public in April 1974. South Korean President Kim Dae-jung was given a welcome ceremony at the People's Palace of Culture during the 2000 inter-Korean summit.

The building is four stories tall and has a basement floor as well.

See also 

 List of theatres in North Korea

References 

Theatres in North Korea
Palaces